The following is a list of notable deaths in February 2001.

Entries for each day are listed alphabetically by surname. A typical entry lists information in the following sequence:
 Name, age, country of citizenship at birth, subsequent country of citizenship (if applicable), reason for notability, cause of death (if known), and reference.

February 2001

1
André D'Allemagne, 71, Canadian essayist, translator and militant for the independence of Quebec, cancer.
Nikolay Devyatkov, 93, Soviet/Russian scientist and inventor.
Sam Harshaney, 90, American baseball player.
John Jarrard, 47, American country music songwriter, respiratory failure.
Amryl Johnson, 56, Trinidadian poet and writer.
Sir Harold Maguire, 88, British air marshal and Director-General of Intelligence.
John Pierrakos, 79, Greek-American physician and psychiatrist.
Leslie Vincent, 91, American actor (Forever Amber, Destry Rides Again, Paris Underground).

2
June Lazenby Green, 87, American judge (United States district judge of the United States District Court for the District of Columbia).
Carol Anne Letheren, 58, Canadian Olympic Association official, brain aneurysm.
Freddy Wittop, 89, Dutch costume designer (winner of Tony Award for Best Costume Design for Hello Dolly!).

3
Helmut Gude, 75, German Olympic middle-distance runner (men's 3000 metres steeplechase at the 1952 Summer Olympics).
Frederick Lawton, 89, British judge.
Gerald Suster, 49, British revisionist historian, occult writer, and novelist.

4
Kaduvakkulam Antony, 64, Indian film actor and comedian.
Sonia Arova, 73, Bulgarian ballerina (Ballets Russes, London Festival Ballet, Royal Ballet, National Ballet of Washington, D.C., American Ballet Theatre).
Sir David Beattie, 76, New Zealand jurist and Governor-General.
Gord Brydson, 94, Canadian ice hockey- and golf player.
Barry Cockcroft, 68, British television documentary director and filmmaker (Too Long a Winter).
Larry Fisher, 93, American real estate developer and philanthropist.
Natalia Gheorghiu, 86, Soviet Moldovan pediatric surgeon, physician, and professor.
Hercules, 25, grizzly bear.
J. J. Johnson, 77, American jazz trombonist, suicide.
Thomas H. Lee, 77, Chinese-American electrical engineer and writer.
Alois Lipburger, 44, Austrian ski jumper, car accident.
Dragan Maksimović, 51, Serbian actor, beaten to death.
Allan Mansley, 54, English football player, heart attack.
Tomás Rivera Morales, 73, Puerto Rican Jibaro musician.
Pankaj Roy, 72, Indian cricketer.
Tony Steedman, 73, English actor.
Iannis Xenakis, 78, Greek-French composer.

5
Jean Davy, 89, French actor.
Jean Denton, Baroness Denton of Wakefield, 65, British politician and racing driver.
Mark Joseph Hurley, 81, American Roman Catholic prelate, aneurysm.
David Iftody, 44, Canadian member of Parliament (House of Commons representing Provencher, Manitoba).
Elsa Irigoyen, 81, Argentine Olympic fencer (women's fencing foil at the 1948 Summer Olympics and the 1952 Summer Olympics).
Jack Shapiro, 93, American gridiron football player.
Inna Zubkovskaya, 77, Russian ballerina.

6
Kojo Botsio, 84, Ghanaian diplomat and politician.
Gus Boulis, 51, Greek-born American businessman and murder victim.
Fulgence Charpentier, 103, French Canadian journalist, editor and publisher, pneumonia.
Stephen Halaiko, 92, American Olympic boxer (silver medal winner in lightweight boxing at the 1928 Summer Olympics).
Agha Hilaly, 90, Pakistani diplomat.
Arthur W. Hummel Jr., 80, American diplomat.
Jack Hyles, 74, American Baptist megachurch pastor.
Filemon Lagman, 47, Filipino revolutionary socialist and workers' leader, assassinated.
Sir Richard Southern, 88, British medieval historian.
Trần Văn Lắm, 87, South Vietnamese diplomat and politician.
Emily Vermeule, 72, American classical scholar and archaeologist, heart disease.

7
Jean-Paul Beugnot, 69, French basketball player and coach.
Marianne Breslauer, 91, German photographer and photojournalist.
Dieter Dengler, 62, German-American United States Navy aviator and Vietnam War prisoner-of-war escapee (Little Dieter Needs to Fly).
Dale Evans, 88, American actress, singer and wife of singing cowboy Roy Rogers.
Mikhail Golant, 78, Soviet/Russian scientist and engineer.
Sir Michael Grylls, 66, British politician.
Stanley Lingar, 37, American convicted murderer, execution by lethal injection.
King Moody, 71, American actor and comedian.
Anne Morrow Lindbergh, 94, American author, aviator, and wife of aviator Charles Lindbergh.

8
Ivo Caprino, 80, Norwegian film director and writer.
Leslie Edwards, 84, British ballet dancer.
Arlene Eisenberg, 66, American author, known for her parenting self-help publications (What to Expect When You're Expecting), breast cancer.
Muboraksho Mirzoshoyev, 39, Tajikistani musician and Tajik rock music pioneer, tuberculosis.
Brian Nissen, 73, British actor and television announcer.
Barbara Noble, 94, English publisher and novelist.
Luis Piñerúa Ordaz, 76, Venezuelan politician.
R. J. Rushdoony, 84, American historian, theologian and father of Christian Reconstructionism.

9
William Epstein, 88, Canadian civil servant and United Nations disarmament official.
Reginald Marsh, 74, English actor.
Herbert A. Simon, 84, American economist  (Nobel Prize in Economics, Turing Award).

10
Lewis Arquette, 65, American actor (The Waltons, Tango & Cash, Scream 2).
Ramzan Akhmadov, 31, Chechen general, terrorist, died in battle.
Abraham Beame, 94, 104th Mayor of New York City (1974–1977).
K. Thavamani Devi, Sri Lankan actress.
Niccolò Galli, 17, Italian promising footballer, traffic accident.
Johnny Hatley, 70, American football player (Chicago Bears, Chicago Cardinals, Denver Broncos), coach, executive, and rodeo performer.
Mogubai Kurdikar, 96, Indian classical vocalist.
Robert H. Lounsberry, 82, American politician.
Miné Okubo, 88, American artist and writer.
Buddy Tate, 87, American jazz saxophonist and clarinetist (Count Basie Orchestra).

11
José Luis Borbolla, 81, Mexican footballer.
Edward E. Fitzgerald, 81, American sports author and editor (Book of the Month Club).
Jai Ganesh, Indian Tamil film actor, cancer.
Raymond Lewis, 48, American basketball and streetball player, complications following leg amputation.
Charles C. Price, 87, American chemist.
Hermione, Countess of Ranfurly, 87, British author.
John Joseph Sullivan, 80, American bishop of the Roman Catholic Church.

12
Bhakti Barve, 52, Indian actress.
Rosalie Gwathmey, 92, American painter and photographer.
Donald Kachamba, 47, Malawian musician, composer and bandleader.
Ellen MacKinnon, 74, Canadian politician.
Herbert Robbins, 86, American mathematician, statistician and co-author of What is Mathematics?.
Ralph Smart, 92, Australian film and television producer.
Kristina Söderbaum, 88, Swedish-German film actress, producer and photographer.
Johnny Warangkula Tjupurrula, 75/76, Australian aboriginal painter.

13
Roop Nath Singh Yadav, Indian politician.
Ugo Fano, 88, Italian-American physicist.
Manuela, 57, German singer.
Victor Veysey, 85, American politician.
Montague Woodhouse, 5th Baron Terrington, 83, British politician.

14
Charles B. Fitzsimons, 76, Irish-American actor, film producer and executive director of the Producers Guild of America.
Forrest Hall, 79, American gridiron football player.
Richard Laymon, 54, American horror author, heart attack.
Maurice Levitas, 84, Irish-born British sociologist.
Alan Ross, 78, Indian-British poet and editor.
Ploutis Servas, 93, Cypriot politician, journalist, and author.
Jim Winkler, 73, American football player.

15
Boris Goldovsky, 92, Russian-born American conductor and broadcaster.
Burt Kennedy, 78, American screenwriter and director (The War Wagon, Support Your Local Sheriff!, The Virginian, Combat!).
Ken Kiff, 65, English figurative artist.
Jack McGowan, 70, American golfer.
Edwin Plowden, Baron Plowden, 94, British industrialist and public servant.

16
Ali Artuner, 56, Turkish footballer.
Dorothy Stokes Bostwick, 101, American heiress, artist and author.
Bob Buhl, 72, American baseball player.
Jerry Frei, 76, American football player (Wisconsin) and coach (Oregon, Denver Broncos, Tampa Bay Buccaneers, Chicago Bears).
Howard W. Koch, 84, American film and television director and producer (The Manchurian Candidate, Maverick).
William H. Masters, 85, American gynaecologist (Masters and Johnson).
Ronald Watkins, 96, British drama teacher and director.

17
Barry Burman, 57, English figurative artist.
Zvonimir Červenko, 74, Croatian general.
John Coughlin, 75, American meteorologist.
Bob Geary, 67, Canadian football player and manager in the Canadian Football League (CFL).
Eliyahu Koren, 93, German-Israeli typographer and graphic artist.
Khalid Abdul Muhammad, 53, American black nationalist leader (Nation of Islam, New Black Panther Party).
Christian O'Brien, 87, British geologist.

18
Balthus, 92, French painter.
Roger A. Caras, 72, American wildlife photographer, writer, and television personality.
Sir Colin Cole, 78, British officer of arms.
Claude Davey, 92, Welsh rugby union player.
Dale Earnhardt, 49, American NASCAR race car driver, crash during 2001 Daytona 500 race.
Frank Bunker Gilbreth Jr., 89, American journalist and author (Cheaper by the Dozen, Belles on Their Toes).
Clare Kelly, 78, English actress.
Eddie Mathews, 69, American baseball player, member of the Baseball Hall of Fame, pneumonia.
Georgi Minchev, 57, Bulgarian rock musician and TV presenter.
Miodrag Stojanović, 50, Montenegrin Serb boxer, kickboxer and MMA fighter, murdered.
Charley Wensloff, 85, American baseball player.

19
Theophilus Beckford, 65, Jamaican pianist and vocalist.
Priscilla Davis, 59, American socialite, breast cancer.
Stanley Kramer, 87, American film director and producer (It's a Mad, Mad, Mad, Mad World, The Defiant Ones, Judgment at Nuremberg), pneumonia.
José Luis Ortega Mata, 37, Mexican journalist and newspaper director, shot.
Guy Rodgers, 65, American basketball player, heart attack.
Roland Stoltz, 69, Swedish ice hockey player.
Charles Trenet, 87, French singer, stroke.

20
Harry Boykoff, 78, American basketball player.
Irina Bugrimova, 90, Russian lion tamer, heart attack.
Rob Dawber, 45, British railwayman and writer (The Navigators), lung cancer caused by asbestos.
Rosemary DeCamp, 90, American actress (Yankee Doodle Dandy, That Girl), pneumonia.
Indrajit Gupta, 81, Indian politician.
Donella Meadows, 59, American environmental scientist, and writer, cerebral meningitis.
Yogi Ramsuratkumar, 82, Indian saint and mystic.
Bill Rigney, 83, American baseball player and manager.
Bob Weiskopf, 86, American screenwriter and producer for television.

21
Anna Gabriella Ceccatelli, 73, Italian politician.
Ileana Espinel, 67, Ecuadorian journalist, poet and writer.
Ronnie Hilton, 75, English singer ("No Other Love", "A Windmill in Old Amsterdam") and radio presenter (Sounds of the Fifties).
Hank Laventhol, 73, American painter and print maker.
José Lebrún Moratinos, 81, Venezuelan Roman Catholic cardinal, Archbishop of Caracas.
John MacKay, Baron MacKay of Ardbrecknish, 62, British politician.
Narain Chand Parashar, 66, Indian parliamentarian and writer.
Fido Purpur, 86, American ice hockey player.
Malcolm Yelvington, 82, American rockabilly and country musician.

22
Leo Connellan, 72, American poet of the Beat Generation.
Dennis Cox, 75, British cricketer.
John Dunkel, 86, American screenwriter.
John Fahey, 61, American guitarist and composer.
Radie Harris, 96, American journalist and newspaper columnist (The Hollywood Reporter).
Evelyn Holt, 92, German actress.
Cledwyn Hughes, Baron Cledwyn of Penrhos, 84, British politician.
Les Medley, 80, England international footballer, natural causes.
Michel Oksenberg, 62, Belgian-American political scientist and China watcher, cancer.

23
Gabriel P. Disosway, 90, United States Air Force general and commander of Tactical Air Command.
Robert Enrico, 69, French film director and screenwriter.
Anthony Giacalone, 82, American organized crime figure in Detroit (purported key role in disappearance of Jimmy Hoffa).
Martin Gunnar Knutsen, 82, Norwegian communist politician.
Sergio Mantovani, 71, Italian racing driver.
Dame Ruth Railton, 85, British music director and conductor.
Piero Umiliani, 74, Italian composer of film scores.
Guy Wood, 89, English musician and songwriter.

24
Phil Collier, 75, American sportswriter (1990 winner of J. G. Taylor Spink Award).
Sir Charles Fletcher-Cooke, 86, British politician.
Hans Holtedahl, 83, Norwegian geologist.
Claude Shannon, 84, American electrical engineer and mathematician.

25
A. R. Ammons, 75, American poet.
Helen Bennett, 89, American actress.
Sir Donald Bradman, 92, Australian cricketer.
Jacques Nathan Garamond, 90, French graphic designer.
Donald Garrow, 83, British Olympic alpine skier (men's alpine skiing at the 1948 Winter Olympics).
Norbert Glanzberg, 90, French composer.
Giovanni Grimaldi, 84, Italian screenwriter, journalist and film director.
Jacob Hiatt, American businessman and philanthropist.
Bitsy Mott, 82, American baseball player.
Sigurd Raschèr, 93, German-American saxophonist.
Lou Steele, 72, American actor, radio, and television announcer, heart attack.
John J. Tammaro Jr., 75, American Thoroughbred racehorse trainer.

26
Leif Haugen, 83, Norwegian Olympic cross-country skier (men's 50 kilometre cross-country skiing at the 1948 Winter Olympics).
Jale İnan, 87, Turkish archaeologist,.
Frances Lincoln, 55, English independent publisher, pneumonia.
Dee Mackey, 66, American gridiron football player, heart attack.
Duke Nalon, 87, American racing driver.
Arturo Uslar Pietri, 94, Venezuelan writer, television producer and politician.
Yaakov Rechter, 76, Israeli architect.
Marc Vallot, 38, Belgian judoka, heart attack.

27
Milton Barnes, 69, Canadian composer, conductor, and jazz drummer.
Ralf D. Bode, 59, German-American cinematographer (Coal Miner's Daughter, Saturday Night Fever, Uncle Buck).
José García Nieto, 86, Spanish poet and writer.
Selwyn Toogood, 84, New Zealand radio and television personality.
E. W. Ziebarth, 90, American radio broadcaster.

28
Stan Cullis, 84, British footballer and manager.
Gildas Molgat, 74, Canadian politician.
Raúl Planas, 80, popular Cuban singer and songwriter.
Charles Pozzi, 91, French  racing driver.
K. Sankunni, Indian film editor.

References 

2001-02
 02